Al-Sanbariyya was a Palestinian village in the Safad Subdistrict. It was depopulated during the 1947–1948 Civil War in Mandatory Palestine on May 1, 1948, by Palmach's First Battalion under Operation Yiftach. It was located 31.5 km northeast of Safad, near Wadi Hasibani.

History
North of the village, a column with an inscription mentioning the Roman Emperor Julian (331-363 C.E.) was found.

In 1875, Victor Guérin traveled in the region, and noted that "debris of a small village" ... "is referred to me as Kharbet Sembezieh".

In 1881, the PEF's Survey of Western Palestine (SWP)  described it as "a few ruined Arab houses."

British Mandate era
In the 1931 census of Palestine, during the  British Mandate for Palestine,  the village had a population of 83; 77 Muslims and 6 Christians, in a total of 20 houses.

In  the 1945 statistics, the village had a population of 130 Muslims, with a total land area of  2,532 dunams. Of this,  539 dunams were allocated for plantations and irrigable land, 1,739 for cereals, while 6 dunams were classified as non-cultivable areas.

1948, aftermath
A complaint to Mapam said that “...I spoke to a number of members from  Ma'ayan Baruch and nearby kibbutzim  and I got the impression that there exists the possibility that there is a desire to destroy the villages and [the Arabs'] houses  so that it will be impossible for the Arabs to return to them. A week ago a representative of the  JNF (possibly Yosef Nahmani) came to visit. He saw that in the village of al Sanbariya ...several houses were still standing, albeit without roofs. He told the secretariat of the kibbutz to destroy the houses immediately and he said openly that this will enable us to take the village's lands, because the Arabs won't be able to return there. I am sorry to say the kibbutz agreed immediately without thinking about what they were doing.“

References

Bibliography

External links
Welcome To al-Sanbariyya
al-Sanbariyya, Zochrot
al-Sanbariyya, Villages of Palestine
Survey of Western Palestine, Map 2:   IAA, Wikimedia commons

Arab villages depopulated during the 1948 Arab–Israeli War
District of Safad